Bahar is a quarter of the town Ardeşen, Ardeşen District, Rize Province, northeastern Turkey. Its population is 218 (2021).

History 
According to list of villages in Laz language book (2009), name of the neighbourhood is Putra, which is derived from "putri" and means "rotten inside". Most inhabitants of the neighbourhood are ethnically Laz.

References

Populated places in Ardeşen District
Laz settlements in Turkey